Free information may refer to:
the tenet that "Information wants to be free"
Free content